Hiran Minar (or "The Deer Tower") is an early 16th-century Mughal era complex located in Sheikhupura, in the Pakistani province of Punjab.

The complex was built at the site of a game reserve in honour of Mughal Emperor Jahangir's beloved antelope named Mansraj. The Emperor is remembered for his fondness of nature, and his complex embodies the Mughal relationship between humans, pets, and hunting.

Location
The Hiran Minar complex is located in the city of Sheikhupura, about 40 kilometres northwest of Lahore. The complex is located near the Sheikhupura Fort, which also dates from the early 17th century. Both sites are accessible from Lahore via the M2 Motorway, which connects Lahore to the Islamabad.

History
Hiran Minar was built during the reign of the Mughal Emperor Jahangir in a hunting reserve used by the Mughal royals. The reserve was built in a scrub forest, and allowed Mughal emperors to experience a sense of semi-wilderness near the imperial city of Lahore. The wild-reserve was used as a park where visitors could enjoy the sport of hunting.

The minaret itself was built in 1606 C.E. as a monument to Emperor Jahangir's beloved pet antelope, Mansiraj, or "Lord of All Animal Beings". The practice of building such tomb-markers over the skulls of game animals is an ancient Persian custom.

The minaret and tank were soon accompanied by a larger pavilion, built during the reign of Shah Jahan.

Layout
The complex consists of a Jahangir-era minaret situated next to a larger Shah Jahan-era complex.

Minaret
The Jahangir-era minaret stands 110 metres tall, and was built in 1606 C.E. as a tomb marker for the emperor's pet antelope, Minraj. The sides of the minar are inscribed with a eulogy to the pet antelope.

Pool
A massive rectangular water-tank pool measuring 229 metres by 273 metres lies at the heart of the complex. At the center of each side of the tank, a brick ramp slopes down to the water, providing access for wild game that were sought by hunters.

Pavilion

An octagonal pavilion built during the reign of Shah Jahan is at the centre of the pool. The pavilion is two-storeyed, and is topped by a rooftop chhatri that served as a stone gazebo. The pavilion's architecture is similar to the Sher Mandal at Delhi's Purana Qila, built by Emperor Humayun.

The pavilion was surrounded not only by the water tank, but also semi-wilderness. The pavilion was thus likely used for recreational purposes.

Causeway
A causeway spans the pool to connect the minaret with the pavilion along an axis which passes through a gateway.

Hydraulics
Unique features of this particular complex are the antelope's grave and the distinctive water collection system.

Gallery

References

External links 

 Photographs of Hiran Minar
 World Heritage: Hiran Minar and Tank, Sheikhupura

Sheikhupura District
Mughal architecture
Buildings and structures in Sheikhupura
Mughal gardens in Pakistan
Minarets in Pakistan